Christian Berkel (born 28 October 1957) is a German actor. He is known for his appearances in Downfall (2004), Valkyrie (2008), Inglourious Basterds (2009) and The Man from U.N.C.L.E. (2015).

Life and career
Berkel was born on 28 October 1957 in Berlin. His father had been a military doctor in World War II. His Jewish mother fled to Argentina and returned to Germany after the end of the war.

From the age of 14 Berkel lived in Paris where he took drama lessons with Jean-Louis Barrault and Pierre Berlin. He then trained at the German Film and Television Academy Berlin and appeared on stage in Augsburg, Düsseldorf, Munich, Vienna and at the Schiller Theater.

Berkel has appeared in many German television productions before starring in the Academy Award-nominated film Downfall (2004) as Dr. Ernst-Günther Schenck. He has followed this with roles in Paul Verhoeven's film Black Book (2006) and the American films Flightplan (2005), Valkyrie (2008) and Inglourious Basterds (2009).

Personal life
In addition to his native German, Berkel speaks English and French.

Berkel met actress Andrea Sawatzki in 1998. They were married in 2011. The couple have two sons. The family live in Berlin.

Filmography 

1977:  - Karol Djudko
1977: The Serpent's Egg - Student
1978: Tatort - Rot, rot, tot (TV) - Doc Decker / Dr. Alfred Waller / Erik Steinbeck / Rainer Wenisch / Uwe Pfandler
1982: Frau Jenny Treibel (TV) - Leopold Treibel
1983: Derrick - Season 10, Episode 06: "Tödliches Rendezvous" - Manfred Kessler
1989: Der Bastard (TV series) - Felix Dennison
1991:  - Man #2 (voice)
1993: Das Schicksal der Lilian H. (TV) - Josef
1993: Ein unvergeßliches Wochenende ... in Salzburg (TV)
1996: Der Mann ohne Schatten (TV series) - Bruno Kuhlin
1996: Lautlose Schritte (TV) - Simon Sundermann
1997:  - Weich
1997: Umarmung mit dem Tod (TV) - Lefevre
1998: Tod auf Amrum (TV) - Rolf Spiekermann
1999: Sweet Little Sixteen (TV) - Thomas Reiner
2000: Verzweiflung
2000: Blondine sucht Millionär fürs Leben (TV) - Dietrich
2001: Das Experiment (The Experiment) - Robert Steinhoff Nr. 38
2002: Safe Conduct - Dr. Greven
2002: Die Affäre Semmeling (TV series) - Fred Kiefer
2002: Der Unbestechliche - Harald Kittler
2003: Erste Liebe (TV)
2004: Soundless - Lang
2004: Der Untergang (Downfall) - Prof. Ernst-Günther Schenck
2004: Männer wie wir (Guys and Balls) - Rudolf
2005: Der Vater meiner Schwester (TV) - Dr. Klaus Merbold
2005: Tatort - Leerstand (TV) - Doc Decker
2005: Flightplan (film) - Mortuary Director
2006:  (TV) - Innensenator Helmut Schmidt
2006: Eine Frage des Gewissens (A Question Of The Conscience) (TV) - Martin Beltz
2006: Black Book - General Käutner
2006: Der Kriminalist (TV) -  Kriminalhauptkommissar Bruno Schumann
2007: Der andere Junge - Jakob Wagner
2008: Flame & Citron (film) - Hoffmann
2008: Mogadischu (film) - Chancellor Helmut Schmidt
2008: Haber (film) - Fritz Shimon Haber
2008: Miracle at St. Anna (film) - Captain Eichholz
2008: Valkyrie (film) - Colonel Albrecht Mertz von Quirnheim
2009: Inglourious Basterds (film) - Proprietor Eric
2009: Attack on Leningrad (film) - Vinkelmayer
2010:  - David Böttcher
2011:  - Heinrich Bockelmann
2013:  (film) - Martin
2014:  (TV) - Ernst Udet
2015: Traumfrauen - Herr Hegemann
2015: Anti-Social - Philip
2015: The Man from U.N.C.L.E. (film) - Dr. Udo Teller
2015: Trumbo (film) - Otto Preminger
2016: Elle (film) - Robert
2016: The Jungle Book - King Louie (German dubbing, originally performed by Christopher Walken)
2020: Enfant Terrible

References

External links

Carola Studlar Agency Munich 

1957 births
Living people
20th-century German male actors
21st-century German male actors
21st-century German male writers
21st-century German novelists
Französisches Gymnasium Berlin alumni
German male film actors
German male novelists
German male television actors
German people of Jewish descent
Male actors from Berlin
Writers from Berlin